Pothos is a genus of flowering plants in the family Araceae (tribe Potheae). It is native to China, the Indian Subcontinent, Australia, New Guinea, Southeast Asia, and various islands of the Pacific and Indian Oceans.

The common houseplant Epipremnum aureum, also known as "pothos", was once classified under the genus Pothos.

Neo P1 is a genetically engineered pothos designed to remove volatile organic compounds from ambient air.

Species

 Pothos armatus C.E.C.Fisch. - Kerala
 Pothos atropurpurascens M.Hotta - Borneo 
 Pothos barberianus Schott- Borneo, Malaysia, Sumatra
 Pothos beccarianus Engl. - Borneo 
 Pothos brassii B.L.Burtt - Queensland 
 Pothos brevistylus Engl. - Borneo 
 Pothos brevivaginatus Alderw. - Sumatra
 Pothos chinensis (Raf.) Merr. - China, Tibet, Taiwan, Japan, Ryukyu Islands, Indochina, Himalayas, India, Nepal, Bhutan
 Pothos clavatus Engl. - New Guinea
 Pothos crassipedunculatus Sivad. & N.Mohanan - southern India
 Pothos curtisii Hook.f. - Thailand, Malaysia, Sumatra
 Pothos cuspidatus Alderw. - western New Guinea
 Pothos cylindricus C.Presl - Sabah, Sulawesi, Philippines
 Pothos dolichophyllus Merr. - Philippines
 Pothos dzui P.C.Boyce - Vietnam
 Pothos englerianus (Engl.) Alderw. - Sumatra
 Pothos falcifolius Engl. & K.Krause - Maluku, New Guinea
 Pothos gigantipes Buchet ex P.C.Boyce - Vietnam, Cambodia
 Pothos gracillimus Engl. & K.Krause - Papua New Guinea
 Pothos grandis Buchet ex P.C.Boyce & V.D.Nguyen - Vietnam
 Pothos hellwigii Engl. - New Guinea, Solomon Islands, Bismarck Archipelago
 Pothos hookeri Schott - Sri Lanka
 Pothos inaequilaterus (C.Presl) Engl. - Philippines
 Pothos insignis Engl. - Borneo, Palawan
 Pothos junghuhnii de Vriese - Borneo, Java, Sumatra
 Pothos keralensis A.G. Pandurangan & V.J. Nair - Kerala
 Pothos kerrii Buchet ex P.C.Boyce - Guangxi, Laos, Vietnam
 Pothos kingii Hook.f. - Thailand, Peninsular Malaysia
 Pothos lancifolius Hook.f. - Vietnam, Peninsular Malaysia
 Pothos laurifolius P.C.Boyce & A.Hay - Brunei
 Pothos leptostachyus Schott - Thailand, Peninsular Malaysia, Borneo, Sumatra
 Pothos longipes Schott - Queensland, New South Wales
 Pothos longivaginatus Alderw. - Borneo
 Pothos luzonensis (C.Presl) Schott - Luzon, Samar
 Pothos macrocephalus Scort. ex Hook.f. - Nicobar Islands, Thailand, Peninsular Malaysia, Sumatra
 Pothos mirabilis Merr. - Sabah, Kalimantan Timur
 Pothos motleyanus Schott - Kalimantan
 Pothos oliganthus P.C.Boyce & A.Hay - Sarawak
 Pothos ovatifolius Engl. - Peninsular Malaysia, Borneo, Sumatra, Philippines
 Pothos oxyphyllus Miq. - Borneo, Sumatra, Java
 Pothos papuanus Becc. ex Engl. - New Guinea, Solomon Islands
 Pothos parvispadix Nicolson - Sri Lanka
 Pothos philippinensis Engl. - Philippines
 Pothos pilulifer Buchet ex P.C.Boyce - Yunnan, Guangxi, Vietnam
 Pothos polystachyus Engl. & K.Krause - Papua New Guinea
 Pothos remotiflorus Hook. - Sri Lanka
 Pothos repens (Lour.) Druce - Guangdong, Guangxi, Hainan, Yunnan, Laos, Vietnam
 Pothos salicifolius Ridl. ex Burkill & Holttum
 Pothos scandens L. - Indian subcontinent, Indo-China, Malesia
 Pothos tener (Roxb.) Wall. - Maluku, Sulawesi, New Guinea, Solomon Islands, Bismarck Archipelago, Vanuatu  Pothos thomsonianus Schott - southern India
 Pothos touranensis Gagnep. - Vietnam
 Pothos versteegii Engl. - New Guinea
 Pothos volans P.C.Boyce & A.Hay - Brunei, Sarawak
 Pothos zippelii'' Schott - Maluku, New Guinea, Solomon Islands, Bismarck Archipelago

References

External links
Pothos page on CATE Araceae

Pothoideae
Araceae genera
Taxa named by Carl Linnaeus
Plants described in 1753
Low light plants